The 2019–20 IP Superliga e Basketbollit was the 26th season of the Kosovo Basketball Superleague. It started on 28 September 2019. On 1 April 2020, the board of the Kosovo Basketball Federation (FBK) ended the season prematurely due to the COVID-19 pandemic. No champion was named.

Teams

Regular season

League table
</onlyinclude>

Results

Kosovan clubs in European competitions

References

External links
Official website of Kosovo Basketball Superleague 

Kosovo Basketball Superleague seasons
Kosovo
Basketball